Sabine Egger (born 22 April 1977, in Klagenfurt) is an Austrian former alpine skier who competed in the 1998 Winter Olympics.

External links
 sports-reference.com

1977 births
Living people
Austrian female alpine skiers
Olympic alpine skiers of Austria

Alpine skiers at the 1998 Winter Olympics
Sportspeople from Klagenfurt
FIS Alpine Ski World Cup champions
20th-century Austrian women
21st-century Austrian women